Wrebbit, Inc was a puzzle-making company best known for its Puzz-3D puzzles. The company was founded in Montreal, Quebec, by Paul Gallant, and marketed itself as "The Puzzle Innovators". Its namesake appears to stem from the fact that the company's mascot is a green frog, and "Wrebbit" is either an alternative spelling or possibly a play on words of the word ribbit.

In the late 1990s, 3-dimensional puzzles were a successful fad, leading to a rapid growth in the company. In 2001, the business was bought by Irwin Toy. When Irwin Toy filed for bankruptcy a year later, Gallant bought back the business and relaunched it in a much reduced state. In 2005, the business was bought by Hasbro, which moved the manufacture of Wrebbit's puzzles to its facility in East Longmeadow, Massachusetts, in 2006.

Gallant died on September 13, 2011. In 2012, Gallant's son and a partner who worked for Wrebbit revived the Wrebbit name and founded Wrebbit Puzzles, producing the same type of puzzle as Puzz-3D.

References

External links
 Wrebbit 3D

Former Hasbro subsidiaries